Roburent is a comune (commune or municipality) of the Province of Cuneo in the Italian region Piedmont. It borders the  municipalities of Frabosa Soprana, Garessio, Montaldo di Mondovì, Ormea, Pamparato, and Torre Mondovì.

Population centres and trends 
There are two main centres of population within the municipal boundaries. San Giacomo at  had a resident population of 247. Istat identified  Pra (1014 m, pop. 12) as the third well-defined ‘populated centre’ (centro abitato). There were also eight minor settlements classified as ‘populated nuclei’ (nuclei abitati): Cardini (1153 m, pop. 35), Costacalda (1135 m, pop. 6), Mondini (920 m, pop. 14), Montà (780 m, pop. 12), Mottoni (964 m, pop. 2), Nasi (850 m, pop. 9), Patelle (1114 m, pop. 7), and Zitella (800 m, pop. 8).

Since the First World War there has been a steady decline in the population of the comune, from a maximum of 1919 in 1911 to 552 at the start of 2009. The following graph is based on figures from the official censuses which have taken place since the unification of Italy.

References

External links

 Historical notes on San Giacomo di Roburent and  adjacent settlements from the site of the Associazione culturale Savin.  

Cities and towns in Piedmont